Saint Maurus and Saint Placidus Abbey, Waegwan, Chilgok, North Gyeongsang, South Korea is a Benedictine monastery of the Congregation of Missionary Benedictines of Saint Ottilien. Established in 1952 by Korean monks who had survived the dissolution of the Territorial Abbey of Tokwon and Holy Cross Abbey in Yanji, the monastery is currently home to 131 monks. Fr Blasio Park is the current abbot.

History
With the rise of Communism in China and North Korea, the monasteries of the Congregation of Missionary Benedictines of Saint Ottilien in Tokwon and Yanji were dissolved. A number of the monks — Germans, Koreans, and Swiss — were interned in labour camps, where some were executed. Twenty-six surviving Korean monks fled to South Korea. Upon hearing that they had formed a nascent monastic community in Busan, Archabbot Chrysostomus Schmid of St Ottilien ordered Fr Timothy Bitterli, a Swiss Missionary Benedictine who at the time resided at St Paul's Abbey, Newton, to relocate to South Korea in order to assist the community of Korean monks.

Bitterli arrived in 1952, and met the Korean monks in Daegu. Soon after, the community purchased property in Waegwan, where a monastery was completed in 1955. By this time, several German and Swiss monks who had been served at St Benedict's Abbey, Tokwon, and Holy Cross Abbey, Yanji, returned to East Asia to continue their missionary apostolate.

By 1956, the monastery had been raised to a simple priory under Bitterli's leadership. On February 17, 1964, the monastery became an abbey. At this time, Fr Odo Haas was elected the community's first abbot. During Haas' reign, dependent houses were established in Busan and in Daegu. In 1971, Haas was succeeded by Fr Placidus Ri, who thus became the first ethnically Asian superior of a Missionary Benedictine monastery. Under Abbot Placidus, a new abbey church was constructed in 1975, and the monastery's printing and publishing endeavors were expanded and modernized. Additionally, Abbot Placidus oversaw the expansion of Waegwan Abbey's foundation in Seoul, which was enlarged from a study house for clerics to include a retreat center and a branch for the Waegwan Publishing House. In 1985, monks from Waegwan were sent to the Philippines to assist the fledgling monastic community in Digos.

Apostolic Work
Printing — Since the days of Yanji and Tokwon, printing has been a major apostolate of the monks. Early on, no more than a handful of titles was printed annually. By 1990, each year an average of fifty new titles and sixty reprints were being printed. Effort has also been directed toward producing books on the themes of social justice and human rights.
Catechesis — In the spirit of the Missionary Benedictines, monks from Waegwan have played an important role in catechetical work. In addition to producing relevant audio-visual resources, in January 1986 the monks began a catechetical correspondence course. Within three years, the course had been completely computerized and more than 104,000 catechumens and interested Catholics had been enrolled.
Education — The monks of Waegwan have also been involved in education. Established in 1969, a theological institute in Taegu offers a comprehensive two-year program for sisters and laypeople. Monks must pass through the institute before making profession. Sun-Sim School, Waegwan, the middle school and high school administered by the monastery since 1955, has nearly 2000 pupils, though government education policies precipitated the closure of an attached minor seminary in 1983.
Retreats — Three different retreat facilities are directed by the Abbey of Waegwan. A large retreat house at the abbey itself serves around 2300 retreatants annually. Every year, a retreat house in Busan receives around 8000 guests. An additional retreat center exists in Seoul.
Social Work — To assist industrial workers, the monks founded a "workers' house" in the industrial city of Kumi in 1974. Here, monks teach courses ranging from marriage-preparation and traditional Korean culture to pottery and calligraphy. Instruction on Catholic teaching on social justice and labour rights is also provided. The abbey's endeavors in carpentry and agriculture employ large numbers of laypeople.

Dependencies
Many of the monks of the Abbey of Waegwan are occupied at a number of dependent monastic foundations. One of these, St Joseph's Monastery, Namyangju, was elevated to a simple priory in 1998. Another, the "Newton II" community at St Paul's Abbey, Newton, succeeded the dwindling population of the original monastery, and was elevated to a simple priory in 2004.
St Benedict's Monastery, Seoul, Roman Catholic Archdiocese of Seoul: Founded in 1958; Fr Clemens In, superior of ten monks.
St Joseph's Monastery, Namyangju, Roman Catholic Diocese of Uijeongbu: Founded in 1987, raised to simple priory in 1998; Fr Francis Yi, superior of ten monks.
St Benedict's Monastery, Busan, Roman Catholic Diocese of Busan: Founded in 1967; Fr Prior Moses Tjeong, superior of six monks.
St John the Baptist Monastery, Daegu, Roman Catholic Archdiocese of Daegu: Founded in 1969; Fr Basilio Kim Su-young, superior of two monks.
St Benedict's Village for the Aged, Kumnam, Roman Catholic Archdiocese of Daegu: Founded in 1992; Bro Alexander Kim, superior of three monks.
St Paul's Abbey, Newton II, Roman Catholic Diocese of Paterson: Established as a dependent community of Waegwan Abbey in 2002, raised to simple priory in 2004; Fr Prior Samuel Kim, superior of 14 monks.
Hwasun, Archdiocese of Kwangju: Fr Romualdo Hur Song-sok, superior of five monks.

Personnel
As of May 18, 2011, 111 solemnly professed monks (46 of them priests) were members of the monastic community at Waegwan. At this time, the abbey also included 17 temporally professed monks, two novices, one oblate, and ten postulants.

Abbot Fr Simon Petro Ri is the current superior of the monastic community. He was elected and confirmed on August 23, 2001, and received the abbatial blessing on September 11, 2001. Abbot Simon is the fourth Abbot of Waegwan. Abbot Simon is assisted in his duties by Fr Polycarp Kim, prior, and Bro Andrea Jeon, subprior.

Superiors of Waegwan

Monks of Waegwan

See also
Congregation of Missionary Benedictines of Saint Ottilien
St Paul's Abbey, Newton
Territorial Abbey of Tokwon
Yenki Abbey
Roman Catholicism in South Korea
Order of Saint Benedict

References

Further reading
Godfrey Sieber, OSB, The Benedictine Congregation of Saint Ottilien, St Ottilien: EOS Verlag, 1992. pp 72–77

External links
 Official Site (Korean)
 Photographs (English)

Asian Monasteries of the Congregation of Missionary Benedictines of Saint Ottilien